Gani Chatra is a small village in a hilly area (Gadoon) in Tehsil of (Topi) of Swabi District in the Khyber Pakhtunkhwa province of Pakistan.and Malik Haider Zaman Khan is the Malik of the village

See also 

Swabi District

External links
Khyber-Pakhtunkhwa Government website section on Lower Dir
United Nations
 HAJJ website Uploads
PBS paiman.jsi.com 

Populated places in Swabi District
Union councils of Khyber Pakhtunkhwa
Union Councils of Swabi District